James McGovern (born 17 November 1956) is a Scottish Labour politician who was the Member of Parliament (MP) for Dundee West from 2005 to 2015.

Early life 

McGovern was born in Glasgow, but moved to Dundee at the age of 9. He was educated at the Catholic Lawside Academy. He left school at the age of 15 and at the age of 16 began an apprenticeship as a glazier. In 1987, after being made redundant, he worked as a glazier for Dundee City Council. Whilst working for the council he was active within the GMB union. In 1997 he began working full-time for the union as Trade Union Organiser.

Parliamentary career 

He was first elected to the British House of Commons at the 2005 general election for Dundee West with a 14.6% majority, following the retirement of the sitting Labour MP Ernie Ross. Since 2005, he has served on the Scottish Affairs Committee. Between 2007 and 2008, he served as the Parliamentary Private Secretary to Pat McFadden, the Minister of State at the Department for Business, Enterprise and Regulatory Reform, before resigning over the row surrounding the privatisation of Royal Mail. He was re-elected in 2010 with a majority of 19.6%.

McGovern lost his appeal against the Independent Parliamentary Standards Authority's rejection of a £23.90 single rail ticket from Dundee to Glasgow in April 2013. The Sunday Herald reported that Parliamentary authorities determined that the detour was unconnected to McGovern's official work as an MP. He had been attending a Labour Party event in Glasgow. IPSA revealed that its bill for defending against McGovern's appeal was £27,000, to be met by the taxpayers.

On 3 April 2015, McGovern announced he would not stand at the 2015 general election, citing ill health.

Personal life 

He is married to Norma with two children and lives in the Law part of Dundee.

References

External links 
 
 
 Scottish Labour - James McGovern
 Guardian Unlimited Politics - Ask Aristotle: James McGovern MP

1956 births
Living people
Members of the Parliament of the United Kingdom for Dundee constituencies
Politicians from Dundee
UK MPs 2005–2010
Scottish republicans
UK MPs 2010–2015
Scottish Labour MPs
Politicians from Glasgow